Farncombe, historically Fernecome, is a village and peripheral settlement of Godalming in Waverley, Surrey, England and is approximately 0.8 miles (1.3 km) north-east of the Godalming centre, separated by common land known as the Lammas Lands.

History
Farncombe is an ancient site of settlement; archaeological finds from the Bronze Age have been found in Northbourne Estate. In more modern history Farncombe appeared in the Domesday Book of 1086 as Fernecome. It was held by the Bishop of Bayeux. Its Domesday assets were: 2 ploughs,  of meadow, woodland worth 3 hogs. It rendered £1 4s 0d.

Few older buildings survive as evidence of its long history; among the oldest is a row of almshouses, built in 1622.

One of the older buildings in Farncombe is Farncombe Infants' School, on Grays Road, near the railway station. It was built by subscription in 1905 and was originally a boys' school. It was a mixed infants' school from 1935, and became a junior school in 1975 with an annexe for the infants school.

Governance
Farncombe is part of one of the five wards that make up the town of Godalming. Farncombe is within the census area Godalming Farncombe and Catteshall (Ward) which had a population of 4600 in 2011.

Transport Links

Farncombe is served by the Portsmouth-London railway, through Farncombe railway station, and the Hoppa community bus project. It is near the A3, which links the village with London and Portsmouth, and the M25. It lies on the River Wey and canal boats can be hired there taking travellers up to Guildford and beyond.

Sports
Farncombe has a youth football team called Farncombe Youth Football Club (FYFC) for boys and girls from ages 6/7 to 16/17. Farncombe has a Leisure Centre called Godalming Leisure Centre which is home to Godalming Swimming Club.  It is home to Farncombe Cricket Club which is on Summers Road and Godalming Tennis Club, also on Summers Road.

Schools

Farncombe is home to several schools, including:
 Broadwater school secondary school is on Summers Road. The headteacher is Mrs Elizabeth "Lizzie" Matthews and there are three houses; Pegasus, Phoenix and Aquilla.
 Farncombe Infants is on Grays Road. The headteacher is Mrs Andrea Simonsson and there are 5 classes, Apple, Lime, Oak, Beech and Sycamore. This school is primary.
 The Ladybird Nursery is on Fern Road. The manager and owner is Mrs Pamela Twocock. This school is of 3 months to the time of full-time education (around 5 years).

Pubs, Shops and Businesses
Farncombe is served by a number of traditional English pubs including: The Freeholders (closed in 2017), The White Hart, The Leathern Bottle, The Manor, The Three Lions, The Charterhouse and The Cricketers which has associations with Julius Caesar who played cricket in the area. It is also home to shops and businesses.

Notable people

John George "Jack" Phillips (1887–1912) was born in Farncombe. He died while serving as senior wireless operator on board the maiden voyage of the RMS Titanic. He continued working as the ship sank, trying to contact other ships that might be able come to the assistance of the Titanic. The Jack Phillips pub in Godalming High Street is named after him.
Alan P. F. Sell (1935-2016), academic and theologian was born in Farncombe.

See also
List of places of worship in Waverley (borough)

References

External links

Villages in Surrey
Borough of Waverley